Spiridon Palauzov (Спиридон Палаузов; July 16, 1818 in Odessa – August 17, 1872 in Pavlovsk, Saint Petersburg) was a Russian historian of Bulgarian descent who studied the medieval and modern history of Bulgaria, Romania, the Czech Republic, Hungary and the Austrian Empire.

He also participated in the organization of the Aprilov National High School in Gabrovo. He was the son of Nikolay Palauzov, who laid the stone at the foundation of Aprilov National High School with its first school. In 1832-1840 he studied at the Richelieu Lyceum in Odessa, and in 1840-1843 studied at the University of Bonn, Heidelberg University and Munich. On August 24, 1843 he defended a dissertation at the University of Munich on ancient Greek economy.

He was elected a full member of the Imperial Society of Russian History and Antiquities in Moscow (1846).

Palauzov introduced the concept of the Golden Age of medieval Bulgarian culture in Bulgarian historiography.

References

Historians from the Russian Empire
19th-century Bulgarian historians
1818 births
1872 deaths
University of Bonn alumni
Heidelberg University alumni
Ludwig Maximilian University of Munich alumni
Writers from Odesa